Southern Division may refer to:

Government and politics 
 Southern Division (Travancore), an administrative subdivision of the former princely state of Travancore in southern India
 Southern Division (New Zealand electorate), a former constituency of the New Zealand Parliament
 South Cork (UK Parliament constituency) or Southern Division, a former constituency of the UK Parliament

Railroad 
 Southern Division of the Long Island Rail Road
 Southern Division of the Wisconsin and Southern Railroad

Other uses
 FA Women's Premier League Southern Division, in England
 Southern Army Division, a former division of the Swedish Army
 Wendell Phillips Academy High School or South Division High School, a school in Bronzeville, Chicago, Illinois, US

Sports 

 American Division (NHL), the southern division of the National Hockey League in the 1920s-1930s
 National League West, a division of the National League in Major League Baseball that was formerly much closer (in a geographical sense) to being a southern as opposed to western division
 Southern Division (cricket), a division of Minor League Cricket

See also 

 Central Division (disambiguation)
 Eastern Division (disambiguation)
 Military Division of the South (1869–1876), a U.S. Army division during the Reconstruction Period
 Northern Division (disambiguation)
 South Conference (disambiguation)
 South Division (disambiguation)
 Western Division (disambiguation)